"#thatPower"is a song by American recording artist will.i.am, taken from his fourth studio album, #willpower. The song features Canadian singer Justin Bieber, who wrote the song alongside will.i.am, Verrigni, and Damien Leroy (DJ Ammo). The latter two also produced the song. "thatPOWER" was released in the United States and Canada on March 18, 2013, via Interscope Records, as the third single from the album. The song has since charted in several countries. A special version of the song is used for 2013 NBA Playoffs telecasts on ESPN and ABC and the last day of TV5's primetime sports block on IBC, AKTV.

Background
"#thatPower" was released on YouTube on March 15 and on iTunes on March 18. The song made its radio premiere on Capital FM in the United Kingdom on March 15. Will.i.am tweeted the cover art for the song on March 15. The song was recorded on February 20, 2013, at Metropolis, when Bieber and will.i.am were in London for the 2013 BRIT Awards. The song was released to American Contemporary radio on March 26, 2013. The single sold 108,000 digital downloads in its first week of release.

Composition
Will.i.am described "#thatPower" as up-tempo. MTV's Jocelyn Vena said the song had "lyrical swagger" and noted how "Bieber brings his sweet vocals to the chorus", with a vibe that "recalls Kanye West's 2010 hit, 'Power'". According to The Hollywood Reporter, the song is club-oriented.

Critical reception
"#thatPower" received mixed reviews from music critics. E.E. Bradman for Common Sense Media wrote, "This one's all about the club: With its uptempo four-on-the-floor bass and kick assault, repeated choruses, and surging synths, "#thatPower" sounds and feels more like a remix than the first iteration of a new song." Jody Rosen of Rolling Stone called the song "a wan melody warbled by Bieber over generic 4/4 beats" and gave it two out of five stars, ending his review with "#FAIL."

Music video
On March 21, will.i.am tweeted about how exhausting rehearsals for the video were. On March 25, Capital FM reported that will.i.am was seen taking part in the production of parts of the video for the song in Los Angeles. The official video premiered on April 19, 2013. An alternate "second screen" music video is available through an unlisted YouTube link when the song is tagged via Shazam. The alternate video does not contain audio and is meant to be viewed alongside the original music video in order to spot the differences between the two.

A special version was shot with National Basketball Association (NBA) players, including LeBron James, Dwyane Wade, Kevin Durant, Dwight Howard, Carmelo Anthony and Chris Bosh, to be used as the opening theme introduction for the 2013 NBA Playoffs television broadcasts on ABC and ESPN. The video is also used at various commercial breaks throughout the broadcasts.

Live performances
will.i.am performed the track at Le Grand Journal on April 16, 2013, and it featured his backing dancers. Four days later, he performed the song on The Jonathan Ross Show, doing a similar performance. He performed the song on Dancing with the Stars results show on April 23, 2013, while Justin Bieber's solos played in the background in a video. On May 19, will.i.am and Bieber also performed the song live during the 2013 Billboard Music Awards, in Las Vegas.

Cover versions
A funk and soul-infused version of "#thatPower" was arranged, recorded and performed by Judith Hill, on the television singing competition show The Voice. The performance was held on May 27, 2013, and was broadcast live on NBC. The studio-recorded version was digitally released during the same period.

Track listing

Charts

Weekly charts

Year-end charts

Certifications

Release history

References

External links

2013 singles
Interscope Records singles
Justin Bieber songs
Will.i.am songs
Song recordings produced by will.i.am
Songs written by will.i.am
Songs written by Justin Bieber
2013 songs
Number-one singles in Scotland
Songs written by Damien LeRoy